Karen Ordinans is an American politician and child care advocate.

Ordinans graduated from University of Wisconsin–Milwaukee. Ordinans taught in a day care center and was involved with the health of children. She was elected to the Milwaukee County Board of Supervisors in 1992 and was selected as the chair of the county board in 1996. In 2002, Ordinans served briefly as the acting Milwaukee County executive when Tom Ament retired. Ordinans was then recalled in 2002 because of a retirement pension controversy.

Ordinans later served as executive director of the Children's Health Alliance of Wisconsin for eighteen years from 2003 until her retirement in 2021.

References

Year of birth unknown
Living people
University of Wisconsin–Milwaukee alumni
Women in Wisconsin politics
County supervisors in Wisconsin
Milwaukee County Executives
Recalled American politicians
Year of birth missing (living people)